The Six Days of Chicago was a six-day cycling event, held in Chicago, Illinois between 1915 and 1957. It took place fifty times during that period, as two editions were often held in one year. Gustav Kilian holds the record for most wins with a total of six, between 1935 and 1939.

Roll of honor

References

1915 establishments in Illinois
1957 disestablishments in Illinois
Cycling in Chicago
Defunct cycling races in the United States
Recurring sporting events disestablished in 1915
Recurring sporting events established in 1957
Six-day races
Sports competitions in Chicago